Sergio Pamies (born in 1983) is a Spanish jazz pianist, composer, and arranger, who has published three albums under his name, and appears in several recordings as a sideman.

Biography

Early years
Born in Granada in 1983. He is the nephew of Spanish writer Sergi Pàmies. Sergio Pamies started studying piano at a young age. He started playing jazz because of his father, a self-taught guitarist and jazz aficionado.

Pamies moved to Barcelona, where he graduated with a BM in Jazz Piano (Conservatori Liceu, Barcelona) in 2007. During his time in Barcelona he co-led the group Yakaré. Pamies toured Colombia in 2006 presenting Yakaré's debut album at Jazz al Parque (Bogotá), Festival de Piano de la UIS (Bucaramanga), and Auditorio EAFIT (Medellín). In 2007 Pamies participated as a piano soloist at Joan Albert Amargós’ concerto premiere Transformacions at the Gran Teatre del Liceu (Barcelona).

Education

After earning his BM at the Conservatori Liceu, Pamies moved to Texas (USA), where he graduated with a master's degree in jazz piano (2011) and a DMA in jazz studies (2016) at the University of North Texas College of Music. During his time at UNT, Pamies was a member of the 7-time Grammy nominated One O’Clock Lab Band, accompanying guest artists such as Bobby McFerrin, Arturo Sandoval, Marvin Stamm, Chuck Findley, Doc Severinsen, and Wycliffe Gordon, among others. He is the soloist in the track “Neil” from Lab 2015, a Rich DeRosa’s composition which garnered a 2016 Grammy Nomination for “Best Instrumental Composition.”  Pamies directed the contemporary ensemble “The Zebras,” producing the recording The Flamenco Jazz Project, which was awarded multiple Down Beat Magazine Student Awards. Pamies was selected for the workshop “Latin Jazz Traditions,” performing with Paquito D’Rivera at Carnegie Hall (2015, New York). His composition for Big Band "Dudú" was selected for the concert program.

His dissertation prepared for the degree of Doctor of Musical Arts, The Controversial Identity of Flamenco Jazz: A New Historical and Analytical Approach, is available online at the University of North Texas Library Website.

Solo career
His debut album, Entre Amigos, was released in 2008 (PSM), with a band that combined jazz musicians with flamenco musicians from Granada, such as Sergio Gómez “El Colorao.”  Pamies performed at the XXI Jazz en la Costa International Festival. This album was also presented at the Ibérica Festival (2009), a Flamenco International Festival that organized a 4-days tour in Prague, Brno, Boskovice (Czech Republic), and Bratislava (Slovakia). Pamies performed at Los Veranos del Corral in a concert featuring his mentor, pianist Diego Amador (2009).

His next recording, Borrachito (Bebyne Records), was released in 2011, and it features Christian Scott, Diego Amador, Rubem Dantas, and Pepe Luis Carmona “Habichuela.” 

 Pamies participated in the festivals XVI Jazz Na Starówce (Warsaw, Poland, 2010),Colores Flamencos (Olomouc and Sumperk, Czech Republic, 2011),Munijazz Festival (Munilla, Spain, 2011), XXI Jazz en el Lago (Atarfe, Spain, 2012), XXVII Festival Internacional de Música y Danza Ciudad de Úbeda (Úbeda, Spain, 2015), among others.

Pamies’ last album, What Brought You Here? was published in May 2017 by Bebyne Records. It features Quamon Fowler, Ashleigh Smith, Lara Bello, and Samuel Torres.

Teaching career
Pamies served as a full-time Teaching Fellow at the University of North Texas (Denton, Texas) for eight years. Pamies was an adjunct faculty at Mountain View College (Dallas, Texas), and was one of the instructors at the GDYO Jazz Institute.

Pamies held an adjunct faculty position at The University of Texas at Arlington from 2018 to 2020, where he taught jazz piano, advanced jazz improvisation, composition, arranging, and directed the jazz small group. Pamies was appointed Assistant Professor (jazz piano) at University of Cincinnati, College-Conservatory of Music in August 2020.

Style and influences
Critics have acknowledged Pamies’ talent for composition, the lyrical qualities of his playing, and his unique vision for combining flamenco and jazz elements. Pamies has cited Bill Evans, Duke Ellington, Thelonious Monk, Miles Davis, Paco de Lucía, Camarón de la Isla, and the “Habichuela” family (Pepe “Habichuela,” Ketama, Josemi Carmona) among his strongest influences. Jazz critic Troy Dostert wrote about the pianist: "Pamies highlights his substantial bop fluency, and his engaging piano statements are harmonically rich and technically adroit, without needless excess: the economy of Pamies's playing leads to some smart, carefully structured solos. And Pamies's compositions are thoughtful and compelling (...)."

Discography

As a leader

As a sideman

References

Flamenco musicians
Spanish jazz pianists
1983 births
Living people
21st-century pianists